Reijo Toivo Taipale (9 March 1940 – 26 April 2019) was a Finnish pop singer since the 1950s specializing in Schlager music and tango. Many of his albums have gone gold and platinum.

Biography 
Taipale was born in Miehikkälä, Finland. Throughout the 1970s, he collaborated closely with Eino Grön with the two releasing four joint tango-based albums.

Taipale died in Helsinki from complications of dementia on 26 April 2019 at the age of 79.

Discography

Albums 
1966: Reijo 
1968: Reijo Taipale 
1970: Ethän minua unhoita
1971: Unto Monosen muistolle (with Eija Merilä and Esko Rahkonen)
1973: Kahden kanssasi 
1975: Amado mio 
1975: Reijon taipaleelta 
1976: Juhlakonsertti 
1976: Muistoja ja tunteita 
1977: Angelique 
1978: Juhlavalssit 
1979: Unohtumaton ilta
1980: Kaipaan sua
1981: Olen saanut elää
1982: Elämän parketeilla 
1984: 25 vuotta taipaleella
1986: Ruusu joka vuodesta
1987: Rakkauskirje 
1987: Kotiseutuni − Muistojen Miehikkälä (with Kalevi Korpi & Erkki Pärtty)
1989: Virran rannalla
1990: Tulisuudelma
1990: Elämän tanssit
1991: Olit täysikuu
1992: Taas kutsuu Karjala
1992: Toivo Kärjen kauneimmat tangot 
1992: Kulkukoirat (with Topi Sorsakoski)
1993: Soita kitara kaipaustani
1993: Onnen maa 
1994: Unta näin taas

Joint albums with Eino Grön
1970: 16 tangoa 
1973: 16 tangoa 2 
1978: 16 tangoa (1978) 
1978: Toiset 16 tangoa

Compilation album 
1982: Satumaa 
1991: Ruusujen aika (levytyksiä vuosilta 1986−1991)
1995: 20 suosikkia − Onnen maa 
1996: Saapuuko hän (levytyksiä vuosilta 1990−1996)

References

External links

1940 births
2019 deaths
People from Miehikkälä
20th-century Finnish male singers
Deaths from dementia in Finland
Finnish tango musicians